Errol Laughlin (29 April 1947 – 22 April 1986) was a South African cricketer. He played in 34 first-class and 5 List A matches from 1969/70 to 1983/84.

References

External links
 

1947 births
1986 deaths
South African cricketers
Border cricketers
Rhodesia cricketers
Cricketers from Durban